Sammy Todd (born 1945, Belfast, Northern Ireland) was a former football player for Burnley and Glentoran.

Club career

Todd joined Burnley from Glentoran as a 17-year-old defender/midfield man in 1962 becoming the third ex-Glens player to transfer to Turf Moor in the 1960s, following Jimmy McIlroy and Alex Elder.

He made his league debut for Burnley against Tottenham Hotspur at Turf Moor in the 1963/64 season, Burnley recording a 7–2 victory over Spurs.

He made a total of 118 appearances for Burnley scoring one league and one League Cup goal.

At the end of the 1969–1970 season, Todd was sold to Sheffield Wednesday for £40,000. He would, however, only make 22 appearances in four seasons in Sheffield and was loaned out to Mansfield in February 1974.

In the twilight of his career, Todd enjoyed brief stints with both Great Harwood of the Northern Premier League and Dallas Tornado of the original NASL.

International career

Todd represented both Northern Ireland schools and the Under-23 team in the 1960s before making his senior debut in 1966.

His first appearance came as a substitute in a friendly game with Mexico at Windsor Park.

He was capped a total of 11 times for Northern Ireland.

Footnotes

References
Clarets Mad
The Glentoran-Burnley connection
Northern Ireland's Footballing Greats

1945 births
Burnley F.C. players
Glentoran F.C. players
Sheffield Wednesday F.C. players
Mansfield Town F.C. players
Association footballers from Northern Ireland
Northern Ireland international footballers
Living people
Great Harwood F.C. players
English Football League players
Dallas Tornado players
North American Soccer League (1968–1984) players
Association football defenders